The 1978 State of the Union address was given by President Jimmy Carter to a joint session of the 95th United States Congress on January 19, 1978.

The speech lasted 46 minutes and 4 seconds. and contained 4580 words.

The Republican Party response was delivered by Senator Howard Baker Jr. (TN) and Representative John Rhodes (AZ).

See also
United States House of Representatives elections, 1978

References

External links
 (full transcript), The American Presidency Project, UC Santa Barbara.
 1978 State of the Union Address (full video and audio at www.millercenter.org)

State of the Union addresses
Presidency of Jimmy Carter
Speeches by Jimmy Carter
95th United States Congress
State of the Union Address
State of the Union Address
State of the Union Address
State of the Union Address
January 1978 events in the United States